The  is a commuter electric multiple unit (EMU) train type operated by the private railway operator Hanshin Electric Railway in Japan since 1995.

Design
Manufactured to replace any previous train cars damaged by the January 1995 Great Hanshin earthquake, the design of the 5500 series is based on the earlier 8000 series trains. The 5500 series was the first variable-frequency drive-equipped train type to be introduced by the Hanshin Electric Railway.

Operations
Together with the sole 5550 series set, the 5500 series sets are used primarily on Hanshin Main Line services.

Formation

Mainline sets 
, nine four-car sets are in service, formed as shown below. All cars are powered.

The two intermediate (M1 and M2) cars are each fitted with one lozenge-type pantograph.

Mukogawa Line sets 

The 591x cars are each fitted with two single-arm pantographs.

Interior
Passenger accommodation consists of longitudinal bench seating throughout, with sculpted seats finished in blue moquette.

History
The first trains entered service in 1995. Nine four-car sets were built by 2000.

Refurbishment
The fleet underwent a programme of refurbishment from 2017, with the first set, 5501, treated in April 2017. Refurbishment includes the addition of external passenger door control buttons, full-colour LED destination display panels, and a new blue livery.

Transfer to the Mukogawa Line 
Hanshin unveiled the first 5500 series set modified for use on the Mukogawa Line in March 2020. The set was modified from set 5513, which was split into two 2-car sets: 5513+5913 and 5514+5914. The 591x cars were fitted with driver's cabs based on those of the 9000 series and two single-arm pantographs. Hanshin confirmed that they would also modify set 5511 as such.

The converted 5500 series sets entered service on the Mukogawa Line on 6 June 2020, replacing the 7861 series sets that were previously used on the line.

References

External links

 Hanshin Electric Railway train information 

Electric multiple units of Japan
5500 series
Train-related introductions in 1995
1500 V DC multiple units of Japan
Kawasaki multiple units
Mukogawa Sharyo rolling stock